Saint Andrew (Guernésiais: Saint Andri) is located in the centre of Guernsey and as such is the only parish on the island to be landlocked.

As it is customary to list the parishes round the coast, either clockwise or anti-clockwise, starting with St Peter Port, St Andrew is usually the last parish to be mentioned in such a list. This gave rise to the traditional nickname in Dgèrnésiais of the inhabitants of the parish: les croinchaons (the siftings, what is left behind in the sieve).

General
Saint Andrew is located in the centre of the island and features hills and valleys. It is split into two parts, one bordering St Peter Port and one bordering St Saviour and the Forest. The upper part of the parish where the church and the Little Chapel is situated is very rural. The parish is mainly agricultural, Best's quarry now being used for water storage. St Andrews is the most expensive parish for buying property in Guernsey, closely followed by St Pierre Du Bois and St Saviour. The postal code for street addresses in this parish begins with GY6.

Features

The features of the parish include:
 Churches:
 Saint Andrew parish church 
 The Monnaie Chapel 
 La Villiaze Church 
 The Little Chapel, which is believed to be the world's smallest consecrated church.
 Military:
 Parish war memorial inside church 
 German Military Underground Hospital 
 German fortifications, built during the occupation 1940-45
 Abreuvoirs (places for cattle to drink) 
 A number of protected buildings 

The parish of Saint Andrew hosts:
 St Andrew Douzaine
 Princess Elizabeth Hospital
 Les Bourgs Hospice 
 Grammar School
 Blanchelande College
 Specsavers Optical Group
 St Andrew water storage reservoir
 Various hotels and restaurants

Politics
St Andrew comprises part of the South East administrative division with St Martin.

In the 2016 Guernsey general election there was a 3,363 or 73% turnout to elect five Deputies.  Those elected (in order of votes received) being Heidi Soulsby, Lindsay De Sausmarez, Peter Roffey, Rob Prow and Victoria Oliver.

Gallery

References

External links
The Little Chapel of Guernsey

Andrew